The Yellowhead Bridge or the East Kamloops Bridge is a road bridge in Kamloops, British Columbia. It carries Highway 5 over the South Thompson River. It was completed in December of 1968 and has a length of 179.2 metres, not including a preceding railway overhead on the south side of the river.

See also
 List of crossings of the Thompson River
 List of bridges in Canada

References

Road bridges in British Columbia
Buildings and structures in Kamloops
Bridges completed in 1968